In geometry, the great dodecacronic hexecontahedron (or great lanceal ditriacontahedron) is a nonconvex isohedral polyhedron. It is the dual of the uniform great dodecicosidodecahedron. Its 60 intersecting quadrilateral faces are kites. Part of each kite lies inside the solid, hence is invisible in solid models.

Proportions 

The dihedral angle equals .

References

External links 
 

Dual uniform polyhedra